Coal City station was an Atchison, Topeka and Santa Fe Railway station in Coal City, Illinois. It served trains on the "Doodlebug" spur line from Peoria and Pekin, Illinois to Chicago. The train was often run with one car, dubbed the "dinky", and made its last run on 1955. The station house is one story and made of brick.

References

External links
Picture of the depot

Atchison, Topeka and Santa Fe Railway stations
Former railway stations in Illinois
Transportation buildings and structures in Grundy County, Illinois